Ganna is a village in Veszprém County, Hungary.

References

External links 
 Street map (Hungarian)
Homepage: www.ganna.hu

Populated places in Veszprém County